Nangalkot is an upazila, an administrative unit, of the Comilla District in the Division of Chittagong, Bangladesh. It is a rural area with no urban settlements. It has 16 unions, the lowest of administrative units in Bangladesh. It is one of the 16 upazilas, the second tier of administrative units, of the Cumilla District.

History

In 1931 Kazi Zaker Husain, noted Bangladesh Zoologist was born in Nangalkot. During Bangladesh Liberation war Nangalkot was under Sector 2 of the Mukti Bahini. During the War 11 people were killed in Tejer Bazar of the Upazila. In August 2013 the area saw violence between citivists of Islami Chhatra Shibir and Bangladesh Police. In 2015 the Upazila experienced flooding due to heavy rainfall. Some villages experienced outbreak of diarrhea. The Upazila Nirbahi Officer distributed relief to affected areas. In 2015 a thief was lynched for stealing from Manikmora Bazar Mosque.

Geography and climate 
Nangalkot Upazila has an area of 236.44 square kilometres (91.29 sq mi).  It is bordered by Laksham and Chauddagram  upazila on the West and east, Senbagh and Daganbhuiyan upazilas on the south. River Old Dhakatia, (River little feni), Hara Khal (canal), Gangoyur Khal(canal), Shat Moilla Beel, and Trishna Beel are notable.

Nangalkot (Town) consists of 3 mouzas. The area of the town is 7.55 km2.

The town has two dak bungalows, One "A" Category Rail Station, One HeliPad and Upazila Headquarters. Most of the Intercity trains (Dhaka-Ctg Road, Chittagong -Sylhet Road, Chittagong-Mymensingh  Road) stop at Nangolkot Rail Station.

Transport 

 Paved road 147.00 km; Semi-paved road 8.00 km; 334 km of unpaved roads;
 Number of bridges/culverts: 466;
 The number of rivers is 01;
 There are train facilities. The Dhaka-Chittagong railway line runs through this upazila. There are two train stations in this upazila- Nangalkot station and Hasanpur station.

Administration
Nangalkot Upazila was established 1983. Upazila Nirbahi Officer is the chief executive in an Upazila. The decision to create the post was made in 1982 by Military dictator Hussain Mohammad Ershad. The government formed a committee, called the committee for administrative reorganization and reform. The committee recommended the formation of upazila parishad under an elected local chairman. 

Nangalkot Upazila is divided into Nangalkot Municipality and 12 union parishads: Adra, Bakshaganj, Bangodda, Daulkhar, Dhalua, Heshakhal, Jodda, Makrabpur, Mokara, Peria, Roykot, and Satbaria. The union parishads are subdivided into 193 mauzas and 270 villages.

Nangalkot Municipality is subdivided into 9 wards and 21 mahallas.

As of 2013, it is one of the seven upazilas of Comila without a fire station.

Economy 
Agriculture is the bedrock of the economy with 45 percent of the population earning their income from it. The most cultivated corps are paddy, wheat, potato, and maize. The next largest segment is the service industry.

Demographics 

At the time of the 2011 census, Nangalkot Upazila had a population of 373,987 living in 72,891 households. Nangalkot Upazila had a population growth rate of 16.95% over the decade 2001-2011. It had a literacy rate of 52.20% and a sex ratio of 1181 females to 1000 males. 7.14% of the population lives in urban areas.

Education 
According to the 2011 census, the literacy rate is 65%; Males constitute 68% of the population and females 62%. The educational institutions of the upazila include 9 regular colleges, 3 technical colleges, 43 high schools (including Mayura' High School founded in 1916 and Daulkhar High School founded in 1929), 34 madrasas, 131 junior and primary schools.  All the secondary schools and regular colleges are under the Comilla Board of Intermediate and Secondary Education split from the Chittagong Board in May, 1995.

Public representative

Notable people
Muhammad Hasanuzzaman (1900–1968), politician and educationist

References

 
Upazilas of Comilla District